George Clarke (3 December 1894 – 30 July 1960) was an English footballer who played in the Football League for Crewe Alexandra and Stoke.

Career
Clarke was born in Nantwich and played for his home town club, Nantwich. He gained a losers' medal for Nantwich in the 1914 Cheshire Senior Cup final defeat to Sandbach Ramblers. Stoke signed Clarke in the summer of 1914 for £125 plus the proceeds of a game between the two sides. He did not appear in the first team however until after World War I. Throughout his career at Stoke he was a part timer combining football with his job of as tailor's cutter. During the war he joined the Liverpool Scottish regiment and was involved in action in France. He was injured, suffering a broken leg but ironically it came playing football for the army.

He recovered and returned to Stoke and became a regular in the side playing in five seasons for the "Potters" helping Stoke gain promotion in 1921–22. He played as a hard working left half whose job was to win back possession of the ball, he did this for Stoke until he broke his leg again, this time in January 1924 against Leeds United in the FA Cup. He never played again for Stoke and spent almost two years out of football before joining Crewe Alexandra. He managed only two matches for Crewe before retiring and became a scout instead.

Career statistics
Source:

Honours
 Stoke City
 Football League Second Division runner-up: 1921–22

References

English footballers
Crewe Alexandra F.C. players
Stoke City F.C. players
English Football League players
1894 births
People from Nantwich
1960 deaths
Sportspeople from Cheshire
Nantwich Town F.C. players
Association football midfielders
British Army personnel of World War I
King's Regiment (Liverpool) soldiers
Military personnel from Cheshire